Yanaki Milev (born 15 April 2004) is a Bulgarian tennis player.

Milev has a career high ATP singles ranking of No. 796 achieved on 30 January 2023. He also has a career high ATP doubles ranking of No. 510 achieved on 13 February 2023.

Milev made his ATP main draw debut at the 2022 Sofia Open after receiving a wildcard into the doubles main draw with Petr Nesterov. They reached the quarterfinals defeating Jack Vance and Jamie Vance before losing to eventual champions Rafael Matos and David Vega Hernández.

Challenger and ITF World Tennis Tour finals

Singles: 3 (1–2)

Doubles: 3 (2–1)

References

External links

2004 births
Living people
Bulgarian male tennis players
21st-century Bulgarian people